Daniel W. Smith (born October 26, 1958) is an American philosopher, academic, researcher, and translator. He is a professor in the Department of Philosophy at Purdue University, where his work is focused on 19th and 20th century continental philosophy.

Smith is known for his interpretation of the work of the French philosopher Gilles Deleuze and is the author of Essays on Deleuze, which has been partially translated into Turkish, Slovenian, Spanish, Estonian, and Japanese. He has translated into English texts by Gilles Deleuze, Michel Foucault, Pierre Klossowski, Michel Serres, and Isabelle Stengers.

He is the co-director of The Deleuze Seminars project.

Education 
Smith received his Ph.D. from the Department of Philosophy at the University of Chicago in 1997, after receiving an M.A. in Religious Studies from the University of Chicago in 1983 and a B.A. in Literature from Wheaton College in Illinois. He did language study at the Paris-Sorbonne University and Beijing Language and Culture University.

Career 
After receiving his doctorate from Chicago in 1997, Smith was assistant professor at Grinnell College from 1997 to 1998 and a Vice-Chancellor’s Postdoctoral Fellow at the University of New South Wales in Australia from 1999 to 2001. He joined the faculty at Purdue University in 2001, where he was promoted to Associate Professor in 2005 and became Professor of Philosophy in 2014.

From 2014-2017, Smith was part of an international collaborative project between Purdue and Paris Nanterre University on Analytic and French Philosophy in the 20th Century that sponsored academic exchanges between French and American students and faculty.

Since 2019, Smith has been the Director of the interdisciplinary program in Philosophy and Literature at Purdue.

Research 
Smith’s research is focused on 19th and 20th century European philosophy. He also works and teaches in aesthetics, phenomenology, Nietzsche, Kant, Spinoza, Bergson, social and political philosophy, and the philosophy of technology.

Smith is best known for his work on the French philosopher Gilles Deleuze. His thesis was focused on Deleuze’s philosophy, and he translated two of Deleuze’s books into English: Francis Bacon: The Logic of Sensation and Essays Critical and Clinical.

Deleuze’s work touched on most domains of philosophy, and Smith’s published papers have analyzed many of them. In epistemology, he has explored the implications of Deleuze’s definition of philosophy as the creation of concepts. In metaphysics, he has explicated Deleuze’s well-known concepts of the simulacrum, the virtual, and univocity. In aesthetics, he has written on the "logic of sensation" that Deleuze developed in his writings on painting, cinema, and literature. In ethics, he has shown how Deleuze derived an "ethics of immanence" from the works of Nietzsche, Leibniz, and Spinoza.

Smith explored Deleuze’s relationship with this contemporaries, analyzing the different concepts of resistance developed by Deleuze and Foucault; Deleuze and Badiou’s different notions of multiplicity; and the ways in which Deleuze and Derrida respectively represented the two traditions of immanence and transcendence in French philosophy.

Smith has also published studies of lesser-known French thinkers who influenced Deleuze, such as Raymond Ruyer, André Leroi-Gourhan, and Pierre Klossowski, as well as a number of recent thinkers such as William E. Connolly, Catherine Malabou, Paul R. Patton, and Slavoj Žižek.

Essays on Deleuze 
Smith’s book Essays on Deleuze was published in 2012 and was called a "a milestone in Deleuze studies." Keith Ansell-Pearson called it a "delightfully rich volume of essays: the essays are uniformly excellent," adding that "no one, at least in the English-speaking world, has done more to illuminate Deleuze's philosophical inventiveness than Daniel Smith," although he suggested that Smith did not "adequately explore" the connection of "Nietzsche's Nachlass remark on overturning Platonism" with "Deleuze's emphasis on the problem of simulacra." Kenneth Noe from Southern Illinois University stated that, "Daniel W. Smith’s work on the great French philosopher Gilles Deleuze (1925-1995) is owed a debt by English-speaking readers of Deleuze that is difficult to overstate." He noted that the book "records Smith’s significant contribution to Deleuze studies while also laying foundations for new avenues of research."

The Deleuze Seminars 
Smith is the founder and co-director, with Charles J. Stivale, of an online digital humanities project, The Deleuze Seminars, whose aim is to translate into English the seminar lectures that Deleuze gave at the University of Paris 8 at Vincennes/St. Denis between 1971 and 1987, and to make them available at the project’s website.

Awards and honors 
1993 - 1994  - Bourse Chateaubriand en sciences sociales et humaines (Chateaubriand Fellowship), French Government.
2004 - Wayne Leys Memorial Lecture, Southern Illinois University.
2013 - Bradley Memorial Lecture in Speculative Philosophy, Memorial University of Newfoundland.
2018 - 2019 - Outstanding Graduate Teacher, College of Liberal Arts, Purdue University.

Selected bibliography

Book 
Essays on Deleuze. Edinburgh: Edinburgh University Press, 2012. .

Edited books 
Between Deleuze and Foucault. Eds. Nicolae Morar, Thomas Nail, and Daniel W. Smith, 2016. .
The Cambridge Companion to Deleuze. Ed. Henry Somers-Hall and Daniel W. Smith. Cambridge: Cambridge University Press, 2012. .
Deleuze: A Philosophy of the Event, together with The Vocabulary of Deleuze, by François Zourabichvili. Ed. and with an introduction by Gregg Lambert and Daniel W. Smith. Trans. Kieran Aarons. Edinburgh: Edinburgh University Press, 2012. .
Deleuze and Ethics. Ed. Nathan Jun and Daniel W. Smith. Edinburgh: Edinburgh University Press, 2011. .
Gilles Deleuze: Image and Text. Ed. Eugene W. Holland, Daniel W. Smith, and Charles J. Stivale. London: Continuum, 2009. .

Selected translations 
Klossowski, Pierre. Living Currency. Ed. Vern Cisney, Nicolae Morar, and Daniel W. Smith. London: Continuum, 2017. .
Serres, Michel. Thumbelina. Trans. Daniel W. Smith. London: Rowman and Littlefield, 2014. 
Foucault, Michel. The Gay Science, interview with Jean Le Bitou. Trans. Nicolae Morar and Daniel W. Smith. Critical Inquiry 37 (Spring 2011), 385-403.
Deleuze, Gilles. Francis Bacon: The Logic of Sensation. Minneapolis: University of Minnesota Press, 2003. .
Stengers, Isabelle. The Invention of Modern Science. Minneapolis: University of Minnesota Press, 2000. .
Pierre Klossowski, Nietzsche and the Vicious Circle. Chicago: University of Chicago Press, 1998. .

References 

American philosophers
Living people
1958 births
Wheaton College (Illinois) alumni
University of Chicago alumni
Purdue University faculty